Guillermo Sara (born 30 September 1987) is a retired Argentine footballer, who played as a goalkeeper.

Club career
Born in Santa Fe, Sara joined Atlético Rafaela's youth setup in 1991, aged four. In 2006, he was promoted to the first-team, but only made his senior debuts on 1 November 2008, starting in a 2–1 away win over Tiro Federal.

On 4 August 2012 Sara became the first Argentine goalkeeper to defend two penalties in one game, both from José Sand in a 1–1 draw against Racing Club.

On 10 July 2013 Sara joined La Liga side Real Betis in a season-long loan deal, with a €1 million buyout clause. He made his division debut on 25 August, starting in a 1–2 home loss to Celta de Vigo.

In 2015, Sara signed with Argentinian club Boca Juniors. On 28 September 2016, Sara saved two penalties against Lanús in the Round of 16 of the Copa Argentina.

On 1 January 2022, Sara announced his retirement from football, after being without contract since 3 August 2021, when he terminated his contract with Atlético de Rafaela.

Honours
Atlético Rafaela
Primera B Nacional (1): 2010–11

Boca Juniors
Primera División (2): 2015, 2016–17
Copa Argentina (1): 2014–15

References

External links
 
 

1987 births
Living people
Argentine footballers
Argentine expatriate footballers
Argentine expatriate sportspeople in Spain
Atlético de Rafaela footballers
Boca Juniors footballers
Real Betis players
Club Atlético Lanús footballers
Argentine Primera División players
Primera Nacional players
La Liga players
Expatriate footballers in Spain
Association football goalkeepers
Footballers from Santa Fe, Argentina